Forged is a 2010 drama film directed by William Wedig starring Manny Pérez, David Castro, Margo Martindale, Kevin Breznahan, and Jaime Tirelli. Forged was released in theaters through Maya Entertainment on July 29, 2011, as part of the Maya Indie Series.

Plot

Set in the cold and industrial town of Scranton, Pennsylvania, Forged follows Chuco (Manny Pérez) on his quest to redeem himself after committing a sin against his son, Machito (David Castro). After Chuco’s release from prison, the boy, now 13 years old, abused and homeless, seeks him out and mutters: “You killed my mother. Now I kill you.” As Chuco’s guilt and Machito’s need for a father take hold, they must find a way to move past the circumstances to forge a bond that has been once broken.

Cast
 Manny Perez as Chuco
 David Castro as Machito
Matthew Rios as Young Machito
 Margo Martindale as Dianne
 Jamie Tirelli as Cesar
 Kevin Breznahan as "Moose"
 John Bianco as Frederico
 Steve Cirbus as Stanley
 Lanny Flaherty as Tom
 Robert Haley as Wallace
 Laura Heisler as Ashley
 Clark Jackson as Bo
 Tony Ray Rossi as Anthony
 Christopher Halladay as Foster Father
 Jen Smith as Hot Girl

Awards and screenings
 Best Domestic Feature, Presented by HBO at the 2010 New York International Latino Film Festival
 Outstanding Film Award at the 2010 Providence Latin American American Film Festival
 Official Selection at the 2010 Los Angeles Latino Film Festival
 Official Selection at the 2011 San Diego Latino Film Festival

References

External links
 
 Forged Production Diary

2010 films
2010 drama films
American drama films
2010s English-language films
2010s American films